Captain George Fiott Day,  (20 June 1820 – 18 December 1876) was a Royal Navy officer and one of the earliest recipients of the Victoria Cross, the highest award for gallantry in the face of the enemy that can be awarded to British and Commonwealth forces. He was also a Knight of the Legion of Honour.

Naval career
George Fiott Day was born in Southampton. He joined the Royal Navy as a First Class Volunteer in 1833. His first vessel sailed to the Pacific Ocean and was wrecked off the coast of Patagonia in 1835. After serving off the west coast of Africa, in 1838 he departed for six and a half years service in the Mediterranean Sea, taking part in the bombardment of St. John d'Acre on the Syrian coast in 1840. From 1845 to 1848, he served in Africa, before departing for the Cape of Good Hope and the coast of Brazil. During the hostilities between the Argentine Confederation and Buenos Aires, he patrolled the Rivers of Paraguay and the Río de la Plata. In 1854, he was sent to the Baltic Sea, and then back to the Mediterranean Fleet, and eventually to the Black Sea in 1855, where he won his Victoria Cross. He was 35 years old, and a lieutenant during the Crimean War:

In 1857, Day was again off the west coast of Africa, and in late 1858 he sailed for the China Station. He was placed on the Captain's retired list in February 1867, owing to ill health. He retired with the rank of captain.

Personal life
In 1858, Day married Mary Ruddell-Todd, the daughter of James Ruddell-Todd, and his wife Eliza Henrietta Campbell, daughter of Duncan Campbell, 5th of Inverneill House. His wife's maternal grandfather was a brother of Sir James Campbell of Inverneill and a nephew of General Sir Archibald Campbell. Mrs Day was a first cousin of Emily Georgina Carter-Campbell of Possil and Willoughby Harcourt Carter. The Days were the parents of three daughters. Captain Day died at Weston-super-Mare, where he is buried.

References

External links
 
Location of grave and VC medal (Avon)

1820 births
1876 deaths
Military personnel from Southampton
Royal Navy officers
British recipients of the Victoria Cross
Companions of the Order of the Bath
Royal Navy personnel of the Crimean War
Crimean War recipients of the Victoria Cross
Royal Navy personnel of the Second Opium War
Royal Navy recipients of the Victoria Cross
British military personnel of the Second Anglo-Burmese War
Royal Navy personnel of the Egyptian–Ottoman War (1839–1841)
Recipients of the Order of the Medjidie
Chevaliers of the Légion d'honneur